Edward Davis Jones (October 7, 1856 – February 16, 1920) was a U.S. statistician and journalist. Jones is best known as the "Jones" in the Dow Jones Industrial Average and as a co-founder of The Wall Street Journal.

Early life 
Edward Davis Jones was born on October 7, 1856 in Worcester, Massachusetts. Jones' parents, reverend John Jones and Clarissa Jones, were of Welsh descent. Jones graduated from Worcester Academy and attended Brown University before dropping out in his junior year. After leaving Brown, Jones worked as a reporter for the Providence Morning Star and Evening Press, where he met Charles Dow.

Dow Jones 

The company which is famous for the Dow Jones Industrial Average, The Wall Street Journal was founded by Jones and Charles Dow in 1882 "in the basement of the New York Stock Exchange"; Charles Bergstresser was a silent partner.

Jones had met Dow while both had worked as fellow reporters in Providence, Rhode Island.

Family 
Edward Jones' parents were John D. E. & Clarissa Ann (Day) Jones. He and his wife Janet had one child, "a son named Arthur Conklin Jones (1884–1941)."

Translations 
 De Boer, Tjitze (1903): The History of Philosophy in Islam.

References

External links 
  Why not Jones Dow, and going beyond the Dow Dozen: LATimes

1856 births
1920 deaths
American businesspeople
American people of Welsh descent
American statisticians
Dow Jones & Company
Worcester Academy alumni